Nitti may refer to one or more of the following:

Craig Nitti (born 1992), a retired American soccer player
Francesco Fausto Nitti (1899–1974), Italian anti-fascist journalist
Francesco Saverio Nitti (1868–1953), Italian prime minister, economist and politician
Frank Nitti (1896–1943), an American mobster in Al Capone's gang
Nitti: The Enforcer (1988), biopic of Frank Nitti
Nitti (producer), American rapper and producer

See also

Netti (disambiguation)
James Nitties
Nitta (disambiguation)
Nittei
Nitto (disambiguation)
Nitty (disambiguation)